The Way to Salvation is the fourth studio album by experimental music band King Missile, released on April 16, 1991 by Atlantic Records. The band's previous drummer Steve Dansiger parted from the band before recording began and his position was filled by David Ramirez.

Reception

Ned Raggett of AllMusic said "The Way to Salvation is enjoyable enough but lacks a final killer touch and "having Lou Giordano on production instead of Kramer is also a bit disconcerting -- he's a great producer, of course, but the crisp focus that he brings takes away from the warmer feel of Kramer's work on the earlier records." However, the critic said "much of the core fun that King Missile brings to the table stays intact: Hall's blissfully funny lyrics and shaggy-dog stories, the group's collective hops and skips through a variety of musical styles, and a generally upbeat vibe." Trouser Press commended the "strong musical ideas caroming between Rick and Xefos" as "loosely structured soundtrackery as verse/chorus song form — are custom built for Hall." Robert Christgau commended the production and spoken word performances, saying "it isn't just the consistency of the sarcasm that distinguishes this one from Mystical Shit", "it's the way he's putting his hard-rock comedy, shaggy dog fables, and sophistical shit across."

Track listing

Personnel
Adapted from the liner notes of The Way to Salvation.

King Missile
 John S. Hall – lead vocals, production, percussion (16)
 David Ramirez – drums, percussion, production
 Dave Rick – guitar, production
 Chris Xefos – bass guitar, keyboards, percussion, production, production coordinator, mixing

Additional performers
 Toaz Junior High School Boys' Choir – backing vocals (1, 6)

Production and design
 Greg Calbi – mastering
 Lou Giordano – production, engineering, mixing
 G.B. Irmiger – illustrations
 Matt Lane – assistant mixing
 Macioce – photography
 Mighty Management – management
 Marc Nathan – executive-producer
 Carl Plaster – assistant engineering
 Jodi Rovin – art direction

Release history

References

External links 
 
 
 The Way to Salvation at iTunes

King Missile albums
Atlantic Records albums
1991 albums
Albums produced by Lou Giordano